Menno Township may refer to the following townships in the United States:

 Menno Township, Mifflin County, Pennsylvania
 Menno Township, Marion County, Kansas

See also
 Menno (disambiguation)